Aasai Aasaiyai is a 2003 Indian Tamil-language romance film directed by Ravi Mariya. This film was the debut of famous producer R. B. Choudary's fourth son, Jiiva. The female lead role was done by Sharmelee. The music was composed by Mani Sharma. This is the golden jubilee of "Super Good Films" movie production company. Song lyrics were penned by Vairamuthu and Ravi Mariya.

Plot
The story revolves around Vinod (Jiiva), who aspires to become a businessman after completing his bachelor's degree. His parents keep nudging him to find a job. He also works part-time as a private detective. He is assigned a detective job to follow a girl and find out her general activities and also if she is in love with anyone. While doing this job, he eventually falls in love with the girl Brinda (Sharmelee) and quits his detective job. Brinda, who is the daughter of a rich gold seller Sankaranarayanan (Nasser), has a policy to not love anyone as her sister eloped with a guy in the past and her father had suffered a heart attack. But eventually, Brinda falls in love with Vinod.

Vinod and Brinda come to an agreement that both should prioritize their goals first and they should never meet unless their goals are met. Vinod aspires to start a business of his own while Brinda aspires to complete her college degree with high scores. Vinod starts an apparel showroom and grows big. He is also made the secretary of traders association for which Sankaranarayanan is the president. Vinod gets into good books of Sankaranarayanan due to his hard working nature and good manners. Similarly Brinda finishes her education with flying colours and awards.

Sankaranarayanan arranges Brinda's wedding with his friend Srinivasan (Anandraj), an IPS officer's son. But Srinivas with the help of a detective Ravi (Ravi Mariya) understands about Brinda's love for Vinod and their intention to prioritize family and goals first. Srinivasan reveals this to Sankaranayan and he feels proud of Brinda and he agrees to get her married to Vinod. Finally, Vinod and Brinda are reunited.

Cast

Soundtrack

Reception
Balaji Balasubramaniam of bbthots.com said that the film, "has all the aforementioned characteristics but unfortunately, is also needlessly vulgar in its portrayal of romance" and added that "Jeeva delivers a good performance. [...] Sharmilee is a tad below him in terms of performance but isn't particularly bad either. But the debutante comedian is irritating and never funny". Malathi Rangarajan of The Hindu said, "Jerks in the narration and unexplained sequences make certain situations appear distorted [...] Nearly every Mani Sharma number reminds you of an old song" and concluded, "Supergood Films could have surely done better in its 50th venture". Sify wrote, "The story, screenplay, dialogues and direction are credited to debutant Ravi Mariya, but sadly the film fails to impress. The film is a rehash of many love stories in the past including Fazil's Kadhalukku Mariyadhai" and added, "The debutant boy Jeeva is cool and has done his homework well. He proves to be star material while TV anchor Sharmilee is disappointing". Another critic noted, "This isn't an instant movie classic, but then it surely ain't as bad as the majority of critics want you to believe either. Instead one should relax and enjoy".

References

2003 films
2000s Tamil-language films
Films scored by Mani Sharma
Indian romance films
2000s romance films
Super Good Films films